Sally Haslanger is an American philosopher and professor. She is the Ford Professor of Philosophy in the Department of Linguistics and Philosophy at the Massachusetts Institute of Technology. She held the 2015 Spinoza Chair of Philosophy at the University of Amsterdam.

Biography
Having graduated from Reed College in 1977, Haslanger earned her Ph.D. in Philosophy in 1985 from the University of California, Berkeley. She has taught at Princeton University, University of Pennsylvania and University of Michigan, Ann Arbor.

Haslanger was selected as the 2011 Carus Lecturer by the American Philosophical Association. The Society for Women in Philosophy named her a 2010 Distinguished Woman Philosopher, citing her as one of the "best analytic feminists" in the United States. Haslanger was the president of the Eastern Division of the American Philosophical Association and was elected to the American Academy of Arts & Sciences in 2015. In 2018, she was awarded a Guggenheim Fellowship. She co-edits the Symposia on Gender, Race and Philosophy, an online publication for recent philosophical work on gender and race.

She is married to fellow MIT philosopher Stephen Yablo.

Philosophical work
Haslanger has published in metaphysics, feminist metaphysics, epistemology, feminist theory, ancient philosophy, and social and political philosophy. She writes that much of her work has focused on persistence through change; objectivity and objectification; and Catharine MacKinnon's theory of gender. She has done work on the social construction of categories often considered to be natural kinds, particularly race and gender. A collection of her major papers on these topics appeared as Resisting Reality: Social Construction and Social Critique (Oxford University Press, 2012) which won the Joseph B. Gittler Award of the American Philosophical Association in 2014. This prize is given for an outstanding scholarly contribution in the field of the philosophy of one or more of the social sciences.

Definition of gender 
One of Haslanger's most influential notions is her analytic definition of 'woman'. Her definition is as follows:S is a woman iffdf S is systematically subordinated along some dimension (economic, political, legal, social, etc.), and S is "marked" as a target for this treatment by observed or imagined bodily features presumed to be evidence of a female’s biological role in reproduction.Criticisms have been made on the marginalization of trans women within the definition (Katharine Jenkins), and the possibility of the Queen of England not being considered a 'woman' by the definition.

Published works
 Theorizing Feminisms: A Reader (co-edited with Elizabeth Hackett), Oxford University Press, 2005.
 Adoption Matters: Philosophical and Feminist Essays (co-edited with Charlotte Witt), Cornell University Press, 2005.
 Persistence: Contemporary Readings (co-edited with Roxanne Marie Kurtz), MIT Press, 2006.
 Resisting Reality: Social Construction and Social Critique, Oxford University Press, 2012.
 Critical Theory and Practice, Koninklijke Van Gorcum, 2017.

References

External links
 
 
 Academia.edu profile
 
 An in-depth autobiographical interview with Sally Haslanger

20th-century American philosophers
21st-century American philosophers
American feminists
American political philosophers
Analytic philosophers
Epistemologists
Feminist philosophers
Feminist studies scholars
Living people
MIT School of Humanities, Arts, and Social Sciences faculty
Metaphysicians
Philosophers of language
Reed College alumni
Social constructionism
Social philosophers
University of California, Berkeley alumni
American women philosophers
Presidents of the American Philosophical Association
University of Michigan faculty
Year of birth missing (living people)
20th-century American women
21st-century American women